The Besed or Biesiedź is a river of Belarus (Mogilev Region and Gomel Region) and Russia (Smolensk Oblast and Bryansk Oblast). It is a left tributary of the Sozh River in the Dnieper basin.

References

Rivers of Belarus
Rivers of Gomel Region
Rivers of Mogilev Region
Rivers of Bryansk Oblast
Rivers of Smolensk Oblast